Anna Müller-Lincke (8 April 1869 – 24 January 1935) was a German stage and film actress and soubrette.

Selected filmography
 Where Is Coletti? (1913)
 The Firm Gets Married (1914)
 The New Paradise (1921)
 Den of Iniquity (1925)
 What a Woman Dreams of in Springtime (1929)
 Roses Bloom on the Moorland (1929)
 Come Back, All Is Forgiven (1929)
 Rag Ball (1930)
 Oh Those Glorious Old Student Days (1930)
 Marriage in Name Only (1930)
 The Great Longing (1930)
 The Blonde Nightingale (1930)
 The Daredevil (1931)
 My Leopold (1931)
 The True Jacob (1931)
 Berlin-Alexanderplatz (1931)
 Hitlerjunge Quex (1933)
 Love Must Be Understood (1933)
 The Daring Swimmer (1934)
 What Am I Without You (1934)
 Between Two Hearts (1934)
 Everything for a Woman (1935)

Bibliography

External links

1869 births
1935 deaths
German stage actresses
German film actresses
German silent film actresses
Actresses from Berlin
German operatic sopranos
19th-century German women opera singers
20th-century German women opera singers
19th-century German actresses
20th-century German actresses